Naziabad (also Romanized as Nāzīābād) is a village in Kabutar Khan Rural District, in the Central District of Rafsanjan County, Kerman Province, Iran. According to the 2006 census its population was 21, consisting of 4 families.

References 

Populated places in Rafsanjan County